Adrian Baldovin (born 5 October 1971) is a Romanian former football defender. After he ended his playing career, Baldovin worked as a manager at teams from the Romanian lower leagues.

Honours
Dacia Unirea Brăila
Divizia B: 1989–90
Cupa României runner-up: 1992–93

Notes

References

External links
 

1971 births
Living people
Romanian footballers
Association football defenders
Liga I players
Liga II players
AFC Dacia Unirea Brăila players
FC U Craiova 1948 players
AFC Rocar București players
FC UTA Arad players
ASC Oțelul Galați players
FC Progresul București players
FC Politehnica Iași (1945) players
CSM Ceahlăul Piatra Neamț players
FC Astra Giurgiu players
Romanian football managers
Sportspeople from Galați